The Encyclopedia of Fantasy and Science Fiction Art Techniques is a book by John Grant and Ron Tiner published by Titan.

Contents
The Encyclopedia of Fantasy and Science Fiction Art Techniques gives encouragement on artistic concepts and techniques.

Reception
David Atkinson reviewed The Encyclopedia of Fantasy and Science Fiction Art Techniques for Arcane magazine, rating it an 8 out of 10 overall. Atkinson comments that "This book is a place to start and develop, but it is worth remembering that all artists have to be born with talent. Even a good book can't give it."

Reviews
Review by Carolyn Cushman (1996) in Locus, #425 June 1996 
Review by Steve Jeffery (1998) in Vector 197

References

1996 books